Engelbert II of Nassau, Engelbrecht in Dutch (17 May 1451 – 31 May 1504), was count of Nassau and Vianden and lord of Breda, Lek, Diest, Roosendaal, Nispen and Wouw. He was a soldier and courtier, for some time leader of the Privy council of the Duchy of Burgundy and a significant patron of the arts.

Biography
Engelbert was born in Breda on 17 May 1451, the son of John IV of Nassau-Siegen and his wife Mary of Looz-Heinsberg.

On 19 December 1468 in Koblenz he married Cimburga van Baden, daughter of Charles I, Margrave of Baden-Baden.

Engelbert was lord of Breda between 1475 and 1504.  In 1472 he concluded a treaty with his brother John V of Nassau-Siegen in which he received the possessions West of the Rhine. Charles the Bold made him a knight in the Order of the Golden Fleece, at the age of 22, in 1473.

After the death of Charles the Bold, Engelbert entered in the service of Maximilian I, Holy Roman Emperor, who had married Charles's daughter Mary of Burgundy.

In 1479, he commanded troops during the Battle of Guinegate and during the suppression of a rebellion at Bruges.

In 1487, he was captured by the French during the Battle of Béthune, and released for an "enormous" ransom 2 years later. In 1496 he was appointed stadtholder of Flanders and by 1498 he had been named President of the Grand Conseil.

In 1501, Maximilian named him Lieutenant-General of the Low Countries. From that point forward (until his death in 1504) Engelbert was the principal representative of the Habsburg Empire to the region.

Death
Engelbert died on 31 May 1504 in Brussels and is buried in the Grote kerk in Breda. He had no legitimate children and appointed his nephew Henry III of Nassau-Breda as his successor.  Engelbert had two illegitimate children: Engelbrecht and Barbara.

Engelbert II of Nassau in art
Engelbert's portrait by the Master of the Portraits of Princes, can be found in the Rijksmuseum Amsterdam. He was one of the last important patrons of Flemish illuminated manuscripts, and commissioned perhaps the most sumptuous manuscript of the Roman de la Rose, British Library Harley MS 4425, which has 92 large and high quality miniatures, despite a date around 1500; the text was copied by hand from a printed edition. These are by the artist known as the Master of the Prayer Books of around 1500. The Book of Hours of Engelbert of Nassau (Bodleian Library, Oxford, MS. Douce 219–220), of the 1470s or 1480s is another well-known manuscript. It has been suggested that he commissioned The Garden of Earthly Delights by Hieronymous Bosch.

References

External links

 Engelbrecht II (in Dutch)

|-

1451 births
1504 deaths
Counts of Nassau
House of Nassau
Knights of the Golden Fleece
Dutch art collectors
Lords of Breda
People from Breda